Thomas Weston was the member of Parliament for Cricklade for various parliaments between 1369 and 1388.

References

External links 

Year of birth missing
English MPs 1369
Members of Parliament for Cricklade
Year of death missing
English MPs January 1380
English MPs October 1382
English MPs 1385
English MPs February 1388